Peter Tibber  (born 7 September 1956) is a British diplomat, who served as the British Ambassador to Sudan from 2011 to 2015 and the British Ambassador to Colombia from 2015 to 2019.

Early life 
Peter Harris Tibber was born on 7 September 1956. He is the son of Anthony Harris Tibber, a Circuit Judge.

Tibber was educated at Haberdashers’ Aske’s School, a private school in Elstree, Hertfordshire. Tibber attended University College, Oxford and graduated with a degree in history in 1976.

Career

Ambassador to Sudan 
Tibber served as the British Ambassador to Sudan from 2011 to 2015.

Ambassador to Colombia 
Tibber served as the British Ambassador to Colombia from 2015 to 2019.

In the 2020 Birthday Honours, Tibber was appointed a Companion of the Order of St Michael and St George for "services to British foreign policy".

Personal life 
Tibber married Eve Levy-Huet in 1983.

References

External links 

 
 

1956 births
Living people
Ambassadors of the United Kingdom to Colombia
Ambassadors of the United Kingdom to Sudan
Alumni of University College, Oxford
Companions of the Order of St Michael and St George